Makhauda Dham is one of the place in Harraiya tehsil in Basti district.Makhauda Dham is situated on the banks of Manorama river, 15 km north of Ayodhya. 

Another religious temple Ramrekha Mandir is also near a famous historical place Amorha also called place of Raja Zalim Singh's State Amorha (also known as Amorha Khas) in Basti district in the Indian state of Uttar Pradesh.

Festivals
Almost every festival of Hindus are celebrated.  Annual fair is also organised here on the 1st day of month Chaitra (चैत्र पूर्णिमा). On this occasion is a large number of pilgrimages gathering can be seen here.

Geography

References

Ayodhya
Hindu temples in Uttar Pradesh
Ramayana
Basti district
Rama temples